Sunday Rock is a historic natural feature located in South Colton in St. Lawrence County, New York.  It is an oblong glacial erratic measuring 11 feet high and weighing 64,000 pounds.  It was moved in 1925 to make way for a highway and moved again in 1965, when the highway was widened.  It is located in a public roadside park, with two concrete monuments to commemorate its moves and the organizations that arranged for them.

It was listed on the National Register of Historic Places in 2010.

Gallery

References

National Register of Historic Places in St. Lawrence County, New York
Glacial erratics of New York (state)
St. Lawrence County, New York
Landforms of St. Lawrence County, New York
Natural features on the National Register of Historic Places